Colbún (Mapudungun: "Cleaning of the land") is a Chilean town and commune in Linares Province, Maule Region. Its capital, the town of Colbún, has 3,679 inhabitants (2002 census).

Demographics
Of these, 5,152 (29.2%) lived in urban areas and 12,467 (70.8%) in rural areas. The population grew by 3.9% (669 persons) between the 1992 and 2002 censuses.

Geography
The Colbún commune is bordered on the west by Yerbas Buenas; on the southwest by Linares and Longaví; on the north by San Clemente, (Talca Province); on the east and southeast, by Argentina, and on the south, by Parral and San Fabián; the latter in Ñuble Region. The municipality of Colbún occupies the easternmost strip of the Province of Linares, which boasts some of the highest provincial peaks and the headwaters of several provincial rivers.

Foundation and Historical facts
The municipality of Colbún was officially founded December 30, 1927. Prior to that date the municipality was called Panimávida and had its headquarters in that town. The municipality of Panimávida had been founded May 6, 1906.

From 1913 to 1954 Colbún was the terminus of the narrow gauge Putagán—Colbún railway originating in the city of Linares.

Administration

As a commune, Colbún is a third-level administrative division of Chile administered by a municipal council, headed by an alcalde who is directly elected every four years. The 2008-2012 alcalde is Pedro Pablo Muñoz Oses (Ind.). The municipal council has the following members:
 José Hernán Núñez Ramos (PPD)
 Lupercio Díaz Gutiérrez (UDI)
 Teresa Fuentes Loyola (PRI)
 María Eugenia Riveros Medina (PRSD)
 Jose Hernán Salgado Bustos (RN)
 Manuel Ortiz Bustos (PS)

Within the electoral divisions of Chile, Colbún is represented in the Chamber of Deputies by Jorge Tarud (PDC) and Romilio Gutiérrez (UDI) as part of the 39th electoral district, together with Linares, San Javier, Villa Alegre and Yerbas Buenas. The commune is represented in the Senate by Hernán Larraín (UDI) and Ximena Rincón González (PDC) as part of the 11th senatorial constituency (Maule-South).

Attractions
In the vicinity of Colbún there are two well-known Chilean spas: the "Termas de Quinamávida" and the "Termas de Panimávida". In addition, the municipality concentrates the hydroelectric industry of the province, with the important power stations of Colbún and Machicura. The Colbún dam lake is a centre for recreation and water sports although these are highly dependent on water levels, which tend to be erratic.

Local customs

Crafts
Near Panimávida lies the village of Rari, famous for its unique crafts made of horse hair.

References

External links
  Municipality of Colbún
 Aerial view of an area of the municipality of Colbún Shows the larger Colbún dam lake, to the north-east and the Machicura dam lake to the south-west.
  Aerial view of the city of Colbún (Google maps)
Aerial view of Panimávida (Google maps)

Communes of Chile
Populated places established in 1927
Populated places in Linares Province